The Burmese star tortoise (Geochelone platynota) is a critically endangered tortoise species, native to the dry, deciduous forests of Myanmar (Burma). It is close to extinction in Myanmar, as it is eaten 
by the native Burmese.

Description
The Burmese star tortoise has radiating star-shaped patterns on its strongly domed carapace. It has bumps on its shell that look like stars.
This tortoise can easily be distinguished from the more common Indian star tortoise by comparing the plastrons of the two species.

Conservation
The Burmese star tortoise is considered critically endangered by the IUCN. However it is still commonly eaten and is exported to food markets in neighbouring China. One recent expedition in Burma searched for the species in its habitat for 400 hours with specially trained dogs and five volunteers, and only found five tortoises.

It is on CITES Appendix I, commercial trade in wild-caught specimens is illegal (permitted only in exceptional licensed circumstances). Reportedly, Myanmar has never granted an export permit, meaning most captive-bred tortoises are originally from illegal tortoises, or imports grandfathered in prior to the CITES listing.

Captive breeding
The breeding of the Burmese star tortoise is difficult, and its first successful breeding in captivity was in Taipei Zoo, Taiwan, where a few Burmese star tortoises were hatched in 2003.

Yadanabon Zoological Gardens is also currently engaged in a captive-breeding program to attempt to increase the population of this tortoise.

Starting with 200 tortoises in 2004, by October 2017, there were 14,000 tortoises in breeding programs and 1000 have been reintroduced into the wild. On 31 July 2021, Richard Branson announced two baby Burmese star tortoises were born on his private island, Necker Island, as part of his ongoing conservation work for the species.

References

  Listed as Critically Endangered (CR A1cd+2 cd, C2a v2.3)

External links 

 Columbia Science Review
Assessing reintroduction sites for Burmese star tortoises
Population status and conservation of the Critically Endangered Burmese Star Tortoise Geochelone platynota in central Myanmar
 Convention on International Trade in Endangered Species of Wild Fauna and Flora

Geochelone
Turtles of Asia
Endemic fauna of Myanmar
Reptiles of Myanmar
Critically endangered fauna of Asia
Species endangered by the pet trade
Species endangered by use as food
Reptiles described in 1863
Taxa named by Edward Blyth
Reptiles as pets